Helmut Summersberger is an Austrian Magic: The Gathering player. His best finishes include a sixth place at the 2000 World Championship in Brussels, and a second-place finish with the Austrian national team at the 2007 World Championship in New York City.

Achievements

References

Living people
Magic: The Gathering players
Year of birth missing (living people)